Derek Boyer (born 14 June 1969) is a Fijian-Australian world champion powerlifter, former professional strongman competitor and actor.

Strongman and powerlifting
Boyer has competed seven times in the World's Strongest Man contest, reaching the finals in 1997. He is the reigning 12 time Australia's Strongest Man, winning from 2000–2011. Boyer goes by the nickname "The Island Warrior". He has won numerous powerlifting titles in Australia.

Boyer currently holds the Guinness World Record for heaviest truck pulled, after he pulled a Kenworth K104 truck weighing 51,840 kg (114,287 lb - 51.84 metric tons) over a level 100 ft (30.48 m) course in Brisbane, Queensland, Australia, on 6 March 2005. He captured his 11th straight Australia's Strongest Man title on 5 June 2010.

Acting and television
Boyer has portrayed Bayman in DOA: Dead or Alive and promoted the steel products company Orcon, as Orcon's "Man of Steel", featuring Orcon's trackside promotional efforts at V8 Supercars events where Orcon has been a sponsor of race teams, Larkham Motor Sport, WPS Racing and Ford Performance Racing. He took on the role of 'Thunder' in the revived version of the Australian television sports entertainment series Gladiators in 2008. He specialized in strength events like Duel, Whiplash and Sumo Ball, where he used his weight advantage.

Boyer appeared on Channel nine's The Footy Show (AFL) on 19 August 2010 and with Shane Crawford attempted the world record for the most bench presses (weight had to be over 100 kg) in a minute. With no practice at all he achieved 116 with the record standing at 121. In a later attempt on the record on 23 September on The Footy Show, Boyer managed to break the record completing 126 bench presses.

Boyer was featured on the SBS program Housos as Bubbles, a prisoner who takes a shine to the "white meat" of Dazza Jones, and reprised his role in season 7 of Fat Pizza: Back in Business in 2021. Boyer appeared on an episode of Big Brother and in 2014, he was featured on 7mate's Bogan Hunters as a celebrity judge.

Retirement and return to competition
On 14 September 2010, Boyer temporarily retired from strongman competition in a letter sent to Federation of Australian Strength Competitors (FASC) president Bill Lyndon. He stated that he will be focusing on powerlifting and sumo, and he won the Heavyweight category in the 2010 Australian Sumo Championships. However he quickly came out of retirement just six months later.

References

External links

1969 births
Living people
Australian male film actors
Fijian strength athletes
Australian strength athletes
Australian powerlifters
Fijian male film actors
Fijian emigrants to Australia
Australian male television actors
Sportspeople from Lautoka
Fijian people of British descent
Fijian sumo wrestlers
Australian sumo wrestlers
Sportspeople from the Gold Coast, Queensland
Male actors from the Gold Coast, Queensland